Felix Dhünen (real name Franz Sondinger; 5 January 1896 – 8 December 1939) was a German poet. He was born in Germersheim and died in Berlin. In 1936 he won a gold medal in the art competitions of the Olympic Games for his "Der Läufer" ("The Runner").

References

1896 births
1939 deaths
Olympic gold medalists in art competitions
German male poets
20th-century German poets
Medalists at the 1936 Summer Olympics
20th-century German male writers
Olympic competitors in art competitions